State Route 118 (SR-118) is a state highway in the US state of Utah linking I-70/US-89 and Joseph to Richfield. The route is the main street for Joseph, Monroe and Richfield and spans . The highway was established 1931, initially connecting Joseph to Monroe and Central Valley. Eventually, maintenance of the road was extended north to near Salina.

Route description

The highway begins at a diamond interchange on I-70/US-89 at exit 25 on the west side of Joseph and heads east as a two-lane undivided highway. The road enters Joseph as Main Street and turns northeast after exiting the town. The route intersects a few local roads before briefly curving southeast. The road now heads east-northeast before turning southeast and eventually east as the highway traverses the hills that separate Joseph and Monroe. More streets intersect the route before it enters Monroe as 100 South. In central Monroe, the highway turns north onto Main Street. Exiting Monroe and entering rural surroundings, it veers slightly eastward, passing through the community of Austin. East of Elsinore, the route meets SR-258 and turns northeast along the former routing of US 89.

North of Central Valley, the route passes Richfield Municipal Airport. North of the airport, the road enters Richfield as Main Street, widens to four lanes, and straightens to the north before a short overlap with SR-120 commences. As the concurrency ends, SR-120 continues north on Main Street while SR-118 turns east onto 300 North, a two-lane highway. The highway exits Richfield while SR-119 splits off toward Glenwood and SR-118 turns northeast. The route continues in this direction in a rural environment before terminating at SR-24 north of Sigurd and southwest of Salina.

History
State Route 118 was formed in 1931 as a connector between Joseph and SR-11 to Central via Monroe. In 1957, the northern terminus was set to SR-258. In 1969, a proposed connection between Joseph and unfinished–I-70 was added to the system.

In 1992, US-89 in the area was realigned to coincide with I-70 with the old alignment of US-89 from Elsinore to Sigurd transferred to SR-118. This included most of SR-258, all of SR-135, and a small part of SR-119. As a result of this transfer, SR-135 was deleted from the state highway system. A new SR-135 was designated in 2016.

Major intersections

References

118
 118
Transportation in Sevier County, Utah